There are over 9,000 Grade I listed buildings in England.  This page is a list of these buildings in the county of Leicestershire, by district.

Blaby

|}

Charnwood

|}

City of Leicester

|}

Harborough

|}

Hinckley and Bosworth

|}

Melton

|}

North West Leicestershire

|}

Oadby and Wigston

|}

See also
 Grade II* listed buildings in Leicestershire

References 
National Heritage List for England

Notes

External links

 
listed buildings